The Baguashan Tunnel, on Provincial Highway No. 76, Taiwan, transverses Baguashan (八卦山) between Lincuo IC. (林厝交流道) and Zhongxing JCT. (中興系統交流道). Connecting Yuanlin, Changhua and Caotun, Nantou, its opening significantly reduced the travel time between Changhua and Nantou.

It was the longest highway tunnel in Taiwan when opened to traffic in April 2005, until the top rank moved to Hsuehshan Tunnel in National Highway No. 5 in June 2006. It is now the second longest highway tunnel in Taiwan.

History
On 15 November 1996, construction started.
On 5 October 2000, a civil house above the tunnel collapsed and the work stopped for one year.
On 29 April 2005, the tunnel opened to traffic in the first step. Only small vehicles were allowed. A truck over 3500 kg in gross weights and a bus with 10 or more seats including the driver were prohibited while the authorities were not ready to deal with emergencies involving large vehicles.
On 5 September 2005, the first vehicular accident occurred. The supposedly drunk driver hit the sidewall in the tunnel and caused a vehicular fire.
On 1 January 2006, the tunnel opened to buses.
On 1 January 2007, the tunnel opened to trucks less than 21 tons in gross weights.

Related information
Lanes: The tunnel has two lanes in each of the two tubes.
Speed limit: 80 km/h
Constructing authority: Directorate General of Highways (公路總局)
Maintaining authority: Directorate General of Highways
Traffic opening has been step by step. It is now the third step.
The first step allowed small vehicles on 29 April, 2005.
The second step allowed buses on 1 January, 2006.
The third step allowed heavy trucks on 1 January 2007. But vehicles with hazardous materials or being too long, too wide, too high, or too heavy (more than 21 tons in gross weights, including combination vehicles like full-trailers and semi-trailers) are still remain banned.

See also
Provincial Highway No. 76 (Taiwan)

External links
Tours organized by MOTC visits Japan and Europe for long tunnel’s safety, management and rescue strategies
Directorate General of Highways: Baguashan Tunnel Driving information (Chinese)

2005 establishments in Taiwan
Road tunnels in Taiwan
Tunnels completed in 2005
Buildings and structures in Nantou County
Transportation in Nantou County
Buildings and structures in Changhua County
Transportation in Changhua County